It Boy (French title: 20 ans d'écart) is a 2013 French romantic comedy film directed by David Moreau. It stars Virginie Efira and Pierre Niney, and narrates the story of a 38-year-old woman and her relationship with a teenage boy.

Cast
 Virginie Efira as Alice Lantins
 Pierre Niney as Balthazar
 Charles Berling as Luc Apfel
  as Vincent Khan
 Camille Japy as Elisabeth Lantins
 Michaël Abiteboul as Simon
 Louis-Do de Lencquesaing as Julien
 François Civil as The student
 Blanche Gardin as The photographer

Reception
In France, the film averages 3,6/5 on the AlloCiné from 14 press reviews.

Accolades
Cabourg Film Festival : Swann d'Or for Best Actor - Pierre Niney

References

External links
 

2013 films
French romantic comedy films
2013 romantic comedy films
2010s French-language films
Films directed by David Moreau
2010s French films